Karhumäki is the Finnish name of Medvezhyegorsk, a town in the Republic of Karelia, Russia.

Karhumäki may also refer to:

People
Juhani Karhumäki (born 1949), Finnish mathematician and one of the students of Arto Salomaa
Urho Karhumäki (1891–1947), Finnish poet
Karhumäki brothers, consisted of Niilo and Valto Karhumäki, Finnish aircraft manufacturers, airline founders, and aviation pioneers

Other
Karhumäki Karhu 48B, a Finnish 1950s four-seat monoplane
Karhumäki Airways, former name of Karair, a Finnish airline